The Winner's Circle is a 1948 American drama film directed by Felix E. Feist and written by Howard J. Green and Leonard Praskins. The film stars Jean Willes, Morgan Farley, Johnny Longden, Robert S. Howard, William Gould and John Beradino. It was released on June 8, 1948 by 20th Century Fox.

Plot

A new foal on Colonel Waldron's horse farm has him feeling nostalgic for great thoroughbreds of old. Another racehorse owner, Robert Howard, would like to buy the young colt, but young Jean Trent, daughter of stable owner Tom Trent, persuades the colonel to sell the horse to her.

Jean names the colt Teacher's Pet and is not discouraged when its practice times are very slow. But when the horse throws jockey Johnny Longden in a race at Santa Anita, her father insists that Teacher's Pet be sold. Howard buys the colt from the heartbroken girl.

After the horse's times fail to improve, Jean sells everything she owns and begs Howard to sell Teacher's Pet back to her. Her trainer Gus believes that the horse will fare better racing at longer distances, and when Longden is convinced to ride him one more time, Teacher's Pet races to victory.

Cast   
Jean Willes as Jean Trent
Morgan Farley as Gus
Johnny Longden as Johnny Longden
Robert S. Howard as Bob Howard
William Gould as Tom Trent
John Beradino as Trainer 
Frank Dae as Col. Waldron
Joe Hernandez as Racetrack Announcer
Elliott Lewis as Narrator

References

External links 
 

1948 films
20th Century Fox films
American drama films
1948 drama films
Films directed by Felix E. Feist
American black-and-white films
1940s English-language films
1940s American films